Jennifer Howell is a Canadian senior level Film and Television Executive and Producer. She is also the voice of Bebe Stevens on the animated cartoon TV series South Park and was the show's Supervising Producer from 1997 through 2006. Howell won the Emmy Award for South Park in 2004 and the Peabody Award in 2005.

From 2006 to 2008, Howell was the Executive Vice President of Matt Stone and Trey Parker's production company, "Important Films".

In 2008, Howell left South Park to head up 20th Century Fox Television's Animation Department as its Senior Vice President. She oversaw all aspects of the animation business, including development, production and current programming.

In 2013, Howell became the Head of Comedy for the newly reformed Paramount Television.

In 2016, Howell returned to her animation roots to head Development for DreamWorks Feature Animation.

References

Canadian voice actresses
Living people
Place of birth missing (living people)
Year of birth missing (living people)
Canadian television producers
Canadian women television producers